is a Japanese synchronized swimmer. She has competed at the 2004 and 2008 Summer Olympics.

External links
 
  
 
 
 

1981 births
Living people
Japanese synchronized swimmers
Olympic synchronized swimmers of Japan
Olympic medalists in synchronized swimming
Olympic silver medalists for Japan
Olympic bronze medalists for Japan
Synchronized swimmers at the 2004 Summer Olympics
Synchronized swimmers at the 2008 Summer Olympics
Medalists at the 2004 Summer Olympics
Medalists at the 2008 Summer Olympics
World Aquatics Championships medalists in synchronised swimming
Synchronized swimmers at the 2009 World Aquatics Championships
Asian Games medalists in artistic swimming
Asian Games silver medalists for Japan
Artistic swimmers at the 2006 Asian Games
Medalists at the 2006 Asian Games
Sportspeople from Saitama (city)
21st-century Japanese women